Arena Națională is a retractable roof football stadium in Bucharest, Romania. It opened in 2011 on the site of the original National Stadium, which was demolished between 2007 and 2008. The stadium hosts major football matches including home matches of the Romania national football team, and usually Romanian Cup Final. With 55,634 seats, it is the largest stadium in Romania.

Designed by Gerkan, Marg and Partners, the stadium was built by German firm Max Bögl and Italian firm Astaldi. The stadium has a retractable roof which covers the playing surface.

In addition to Romania home games and the Romanian Cup final, the stadium also hosts other major games in Romanian football, including the season-opening Supercupa României. A UEFA category four stadium, Arena Națională hosted the 2012 UEFA Europa League Final,  and four games at UEFA Euro 2020 (including the Round of 16 match between France and Switzerland, ended in a 3-3 draw, with Switzerland defeating France 5-4 at penalties). The stadium has also been used as the venue for The International 2021, the annual Dota 2 world championship esports tournament. Arena Națională has hosted concerts by Metallica, Red Hot Chili Peppers, Depeche Mode, and Ed Sheeran.

Construction 
The old stadium was demolished between 18 December 2007 and 20 February 2008, although a symbolic removal of seats took place on 21 November 2007, after Romania defeated Albania 6–1 in a qualifying match for Euro 2008.

The construction phase generated some controversy over costs and delays, with Bucharest mayor Sorin Oprescu claiming that the works were 20 weeks behind schedule in May 2009.
On 8 October 2009, it was decided that the stadium should also include a retractable roof worth €20,000,000.

Construction was temporarily halted in December 2009 due to unfavorable weather conditions.

Facilities 
The venue holds 55,634 people. 3,600 VIP seats are available, with another 126 seats allotted for the press (with a possible expansion to 548 seats). The stadium includes some 360 restrooms and a retractable roof, which can be opened or closed in 15 minutes. It is also endowed with a floodlight system and 2100 parking spaces. The stadium is also very similar to the Stadion Narodowy in Warsaw, Poland, in terms of age, capacity and the roof.

Usage
The National Stadium is a Category 4 venue and as such, it hosted the UEFA Europa League 2011–12 final, as announced by UEFA at Nyon on 29 January 2009. It was required to host at least two major events beginning in July 2011, one with an attendance of 10,000 and the second with an attendance of at least 40,000.

The stadium also hosted The International 2021, the annual world championship for the video game Dota 2, in October 2021. This came after the original hosts, Sweden, did not classify esports as a sporting event, making it more difficult for players to procure visas to the country.

History 

The official inauguration was initially scheduled for 10 August 2011, and was to feature a football match between Romania and Argentina.

However, on 26 July, Argentina officially cancelled the friendly match after their manager Sergio Batista departed the team, so the stadium was instead inaugurated on 6 September 2011, with a UEFA Euro 2012 Group D qualifier match between Romania and France. The game ended 0–0 in front of a crowd of 49,137.

Notable attendances 
The highest audience for a football game was achieved at the 2014 FIFA World Cup qualification match between Romania and Netherlands, hosted on 16 October 2012, which brought 53,329 people to the stadium.

The second largest audience was hosted at the UEFA Europa League Final on 9 May 2012. The game between the two Spanish teams, Atlético Madrid and Athletic Bilbao, brought 52,347 people to the stadium.

Association football 

Notes

Romania national football team matches 
On 6 September 2011, the Romania national football team, played the opening match against the French team which ended with a goalless draw, after Argentina cancelled the official inauguration, a friendly match between Romania and Argentina on 10 August 2011.

Notes

Euro 2020 matches 
Arena Națională was one of the stadiums that hosted matches for the UEFA Euro 2020. Three Group C matches and a Round of 16 game were played there.

Concerts

Transport 
The stadium is served by public transport with buses, trolleybuses, trams and the subway system. The nearest subway station (Piata Muncii) is about 1.7 km away (a 22 minute walk).

See also 
Stadionul Steaua
Stadionul Arcul de Triumf
Stadionul Rapid
List of football stadiums in Romania
Waldstadion
Stadion Narodowy

References

External links 

 Arena Națională official website

Football venues in Romania
Sports venues in Bucharest
Concert halls in Romania
Music venues in Romania
Romania
FC Steaua București
Retractable-roof stadiums in Europe
Gerkan, Marg and Partners buildings
UEFA Euro 2020 stadiums
Sports venues completed in 2011
2011 establishments in Romania
Esports venues